Language of Silence is the sixth studio album by Numb, released on November 24, 1998 by Metropolis Records. The album was conceived previous to the band's fifth album Blood Meridian but could not be released due to legal issues concerning Numb's label in Europe.

Reception

AllMusic awarded Language of Silence four and a half out of five stars, commending the ominous atmosphere and saying the "synth sounds have been sharpened without losing any of their viciousness, while melodies have matured, forming a new blend that allows the complexities to show through in a way they have not in previous Numb releases." Alternative Press gave the album a positive review, saying "dancefloor consciousness abounds on Language" and that "Numb have cultivated their own affection for noise." Michael Mahan of CMJ praised Language of Silence, calling it a "sonically intimidating" album "with mountains of guitar feedback, waves of synthesized chaos and a lion's share of aggressive, angst-ridden vocal terrorism." Ink 19 called the album a masterpiece without shortcomings. Critics at Last Sigh Magazine called it the band's masterpiece, saying "Don Gordon and David Collings come together once more to terrify their audience with the brutal reality of what occurs in everyday life through their undeniably intense and fast-paced beats coupled with a vengeful stream-of-consciousness lyrical rage of such intelligence and imagination it rivals the writings of James Joyce himself."

Track listing

Personnel
Adapted from the Language of Silence liner notes.

Numb
 David Collings – lead vocals, instruments, production
 Don Gordon – instruments, production

Production and design
 Ken Marshall – engineering (1, 2)
 Tim Oberthier – engineering (3-10)
 Farben+Formen – cover art, illustrations, design
 Craig Waddell – mastering

Release history

References

External links 
 Language of Silence at Bandcamp
 

1998 albums
Numb (band) albums
Metropolis Records albums
Zoth Ommog albums